Maacah (or Maakah;  Maʿăḵā, "crushed"; Maacha in the Codex Alexandrinus, Maachah in the KJV) is a non-gender-specific personal name used in the Bible to refer to a number of people.

A child of Abraham's brother Nachor, evidently a boy. (Genesis 22:23,24)
The wife of Machir, Manasseh's son. (1 Chronicles 7:15-16)
One of the wives of Hezron's son Caleb. (1 Chronicles 2:48)
A wife of David, and daughter of Talmai, King of Geshur (1 Chronicles 3:2), a near neighbor of the Maachathites.  David fathered Absalom and Tamar by her.
A King of Gath, to whose son, Achish, Shimei's servants fled early in Solomon's reign (1 Kings 2:39). About a half-century earlier than this event, David with 600 men had fled to Achish, son of Maoch, King of Gath (1 Samuel 27:2); but the identification of Maoch is doubtful, though kinship is exceedingly probable.
 Daughter of Absalom, favorite wife of Rehoboam, mother of Abijah of Judah, and grandmother of Asa of Judah.  She served as Queen Mother for Asa, until he deposed her for idolatry.  (1 Kings 15:1-14, 2 Chronicles 11:20-22, 2 Chronicles 15:16)
The wife of Jehiel (father of Gibeon). (1 Chronicles 8:29)
The father of Hanan, who was a man in David's army. (1 Chronicles 11:43)
The father of Shephatiah, who was an office man in David's time. (1 Chronicles 27:16)

The name is also used to refer to:
Aram-Ma'akah, a small Aramean kingdom east of the Sea of Galilee (1 Chronicles 19:6). Its territory was in the region assigned to the half-tribe of Manasseh east of the Jordan. Maacah, its king, became a mercenary of the Ammonites in their war against David (2 Samuel 10:6). It is probable that the city Abel of Beth-maachah in Naphtali (2 Samuel 10:15) derived its name from its relation to this kingdom and people.

References
 
 Entry for the kingdom at the International Standard Bible Encyclopedia, 1915
 Entry for the persons at the International Standard Bible Encyclopedia, 1915

Citations

11th-century BC women
10th-century BC women
Book of Genesis people
Hebrew Bible places
Jewish royalty
Wives of David
Aramean states
Queen mothers
Women in the Hebrew Bible
Absalom